Paweł Gil (born 28 June 1976) is a Polish former football referee.

Gil became a FIFA referee in 2009. He has served as a referee in international competitions including UEFA Euro 2012 qualification and 2014 World Cup qualifiers. Moreover, he refereed at 2012–13 UEFA Champions League and the 2020–21 Polish Cup final game.

On 13 August 2021, he announced the end of his referee's career. The decision was related to starting a job at UEFA connected with VAR.

References 

1976 births
Living people
Sportspeople from Lublin
Polish football referees
UEFA Champions League referees
2018 FIFA World Cup referees